Casa Rio is an organized hamlet in Saskatchewan.  The hamlet was formally established on May 21, 2002.

According to Environics Analytics, it was one of the five wealthiest neighbourhoods in Saskatchewan in 2013.

See also 
 List of communities in Saskatchewan
 Villages of Saskatchewan

References

Organized hamlets in Saskatchewan